Akbarabad-e Nivesht (also Romanized as Akbarābād-e Nīvesht; also known as Akbarābād) is a village in Shahsavan Kandi Rural District, in the Central District of Saveh County, Markazi Province, Iran. At the 2006 census, its population was 54, in 11 families.

References 

Populated places in Saveh County